Granbery is a surname. Notable people with the surname include:

Henrietta Augusta Granbery (1829–1927), American painter
John Cowper Granbery (1829–1907), American clergyman
Virginia Granbery (1831–1921), American painter, sister of Henrietta

See also
Granberg
Granberry